Megachile agustini is a species of bee in the family Megachilidae. It was described by Theodore Dru Alison Cockerell in 1905.

References

Agustini
Insects described in 1905